The Block is the sixth studio album by New Kids on the Block. The album was released on September 2, 2008, along with a deluxe edition that included four bonus tracks. It sold 95,000 copies in its first week of release and debuted at number one on the U.S. Top Pop Albums chart and at number two on the Billboard 200. Several artists collaborated on the album, such as Ne-Yo, Lady Gaga, The Pussycat Dolls, Akon, Teddy Riley and New Edition.

The first official single from the album is "Summertime" and the song was released on May 13, 2008. The second official single titled "Single" featuring Ne-Yo was released on August 12, 2008. The third single "Dirty Dancing" was released on December 19. The single was the album's most successful single in Europe and Canada, peaking at number 31 and reaching the number-one position on the CHUM Chart in Toronto on February 21, 2009 after twelve weeks on the chart. The album's fourth single, "2 in the Morning", was officially released February 23, 2009 in the United States and the United Kingdom.

It is the group's first studio album in fourteen years since Face the Music.

Release and reception 

The Block was released on September 2, 2008 and debuted at number one on the Billboard Pop Album Chart and at number two on the Billboard 200, selling 95,000 copies in its first week of release. As of April 2013, the album had sold 332,000 copies in the United States. On the Canadian Albums Chart, the album debuted at number one, becoming their first and only number-one album there. It sold 9,000 copies in its first week. The Block has been certified gold in Canada.

Track listing 

"Grown Man" contains elements of the Aretha Franklin recording "Chain of Fools", as written by Don Covay. It also contains elements of "What Is Success" written and performed by Allen Toussaint.

Re-recordings 
 "Lights, Camera, Action" was re-recorded with the Pussycat Dolls performing the primary vocals and is included on the deluxe edition of their Doll Domination album.
 "Lights, Camera, Action' was also re-recorded for Lloyd's mixtape Lessons In Love 2.0.
 The demo for "Single" appears as the third track on Ne-Yo's album Year of the Gentleman
 "Click Click Click" was originally a song written, produced, and recorded by Nasri.

Charts

Weekly charts

Year-end charts

References

External links 
 
 Review of The Block at Sputnikmusic

2008 albums
New Kids on the Block albums
Albums produced by Akon
Albums produced by Brian Kennedy (record producer)
Albums produced by Emanuel Kiriakou
Albums produced by Polow da Don
Albums produced by RedOne
Albums produced by Teddy Riley
Albums produced by Timbaland
Albums produced by Fernando Garibay
Interscope Records albums